Aleurocystis is a genus of fungi in the Stereaceae family. The widely distributed genus contains three species. Aleurocystis was circumscribed by the New Zealand-based mycologist Gordon Herriot Cunningham in 1956.

References

Russulales genera
Stereaceae